Erin Jane Cafaro (born June 9, 1983, in Modesto, California) is an American rower. She competed at the 2008 Summer Olympics, where she won a gold medal in the women's eight. At the 2012 London Olympics she won her second consecutive gold medal in the women's eight.

Career
Cafaro began her rowing career as a novice at the University of California, Berkeley in 2001. She went on to make the NCAA team her freshman year, and to win the Women's NCAA Rowing Championships in both 2005 and 2006. In the summer of 2005, Cafaro competed for US Rowing U23 Team in the Women's 4- at the Amsterdam, Netherlands FISA U23 World Championships, where the team won gold.

Starting in the summer of 2006 Cafaro began training full-time with the US Rowing National Team. She won a bronze medal in Eton, England at the FISA World Rowing Championships in 2006 and a gold medal in Munich, Germany at the FISA World Rowing Championships in 2007, both in the Women's 4- event.

Cafaro competed for the United States in the 2008 Olympic Games in Beijing, China, and 2012 Olympic Games in London, England where she and her teammates brought home the gold medals in the Women's 8+ event. Beijing was the first time the United States Olympic Team has won the gold in the Women's 8+ event in the full 2000m race.

In 2009 Cafaro won gold medals both in the Women's 2- and 8+ events at the 2009 World Rowing Championships in Poznan, Poland. This was the first time in US Rowing history that the W2- pair has won the gold medal in an international championship, much less two gold medals in two Olympic events in the same year at the same regatta. Cafaro and her pair partner, Susan Francia were awarded 2009 FISA World Crew of the Year for their performances at the World Rowing Championships, as well as being named USA Today's Athletes of the Month. Erin was also awarded the Female Athlete of the Year award for 2009 by her teammates and coaches on the US Rowing National Team.

During her training in the 2008 Olympic year, Cafaro discovered CrossFit, and incorporated the training ideologies, concepts and workouts into her full-time, year round rowing program. Starting 2009 Cafaro started touring the world as a Crossfit Rowing Subject Matter Expert for Concept 2, coaching CrossFit coaches and athletes on their technique and training on the Concept 2 ergometer.

After retiring from rowing in 2012, Cafaro became VP of Operations for 3Fu3l, a startup sports supplement company. She transitioned into coaching full-time for Concept 2 and Unscared, Inc. starting 2014. In 2014 Cafaro also married Human Performance Coach and NYT Best Selling Author Brian MacKenzie. The two created the sports performance company Power Speed Endurance in 2016. Cafaro managed operations for PSE for 2 years.

Cafaro pivoted away from the sports performance world into the research and mental wellness space beginning of 2018. She began as a Clinical Coordinator on a research project on fear, anxiety and therapeutic interventions at the Huberman Lab in the Stanford School of Medicine Dept. of Neurobiology. Currently, Cafaro is a doctoral student in clinical psychology at The Wright Institute in Berkeley, CA.

See also
 Anna (Mickelson) Cummins
 Caryn Davies
 Susan Francia
 Anna Goodale
 Caroline Lind
 Elle Logan
 Lindsay Shoop
 Mary Whipple

References

Living people
1983 births
American female rowers
Medalists at the 2012 Summer Olympics
Medalists at the 2008 Summer Olympics
Olympic gold medalists for the United States in rowing
Rowers at the 2008 Summer Olympics
Rowers at the 2012 Summer Olympics
Sportspeople from Modesto, California
World Rowing Championships medalists for the United States
21st-century American women